Choi York Yee (born 11 May 1953) is a retired Hong Kong football player and is now a sports commentator in Hong Kong.

He played as a defender in South China for 8 years. He played for the club for the first time in 1973. The defense line formed by him, Lok Tak Fai, Leung Siu Wa and Chan Sai Kau, together with goalkeeper Chow Chee Keong, helped South China to become the best team in defense at the time.

He transferred to Happy Valley in 1978. Then he returned to South China two years later. In 1978, he moved to Seiko and played the last year for his professional football.

On 23 February 2007, he was invited to represent SCAA 92/93 Invitation Team to play against SCAA Elite Youth in the pre-match of the exhibition competition BMA Cup organized by South China.

References
  南華92/93邀請隊──眾星回顧(一) - HKFA.com

1953 births
Living people
Hong Kong television presenters
Hong Kong First Division League players
South China AA players
Happy Valley AA players
Seiko SA players
Hong Kong footballers
Association football defenders